Bermond d'Anduze may refer to:
Bermond d'Anduze (bishop of Viviers)
Bermond d'Anduze (bishop of Sisteron)